Jim Hopson was the president and chief executive officer for the Saskatchewan Roughriders of the Canadian Football League (CFL).  Hopson served in this role from 2005 until 2014.  Under his stewardship, the Roughriders captured the Grey Cup in 2007 and 2013, and the team has recorded record profits.

Hopson has been involved with football in Saskatchewan for much of his life.  He played high school football for Thom Collegiate in Regina, and then joined the Regina Rams to play junior football.  After completing his junior career, Hopson joined the Roughriders in 1973.  He became a starter on the offensive line for the Roughriders in 1974, when his career overlapped with Roughrider greats Ron Lancaster and George Reed.  During 1975 and 1976, Hopson played professional football while teaching in Lumsden, Saskatchewan.  After the 1976 Grey Cup, which Saskatchewan lost to the Ottawa Rough Riders, Hopson retired to focus on his teaching career.

Hopson graduated from the University of Regina with a degree in education and went on to receive a master's degree from the University of Oregon. Divorced with two grown children, as of September 2010 he is engaged to marry Brenda Edwards.

References

Living people
Saskatchewan Roughriders players
University of Regina alumni
University of Oregon alumni
Canadian Football League executives
Players of Canadian football from Saskatchewan
Canadian educators
Regina Rams players
1951 births